The Ten-Year Lunch: The Wit and Legend of the Algonquin Round Table is a 1987 American documentary film about the Algonquin Round Table, a floating group of writers and actors during the Jazz Age in New York City, which included great names such as Dorothy Parker, Robert Benchley, George S. Kaufman, Edna Ferber, Marc Connelly, Harold Ross and Harpo Marx.  It was produced and directed by Aviva Slesin and narrated by Heywood Hale Broun.

The title refers to how the members of the Round Table met over lunch at the Algonquin Hotel from 1919 until roughly 1929. The film shows how the group drifted apart once the 1920s ended, as Hollywood beckoned for some and as they grew older.

The film premiered on the PBS series American Masters on September 28, 1987. On April 11, 1988, it won the 1987 Academy Award for Best Documentary Feature.

References

External links
 
 Aviva Slesin collection of research and production materials for the Ten-year lunch: the wit and legend of the Algonquin Round Table, held by the Billy Rose Theatre Division, New York Public Library for the Performing Arts
 , posted by Aviva Slesin
 The Ten-Year Lunch: The Wit and Legend of The Algonquin Round Table at Aviva Slesin's website
 The Ten Year Lunch: The Wit and Legend of The Algonquin Round Table at American Masters

1987 films
American documentary films
Culture of Manhattan
Best Documentary Feature Academy Award winners
Documentary films about writers
Works about the Roaring Twenties
Documentary films about United States history
Documentary films about New York City
History of Manhattan
Algonquin Round Table
1980s English-language films
1980s American films